South Hornsey was a local government district in Middlesex, England from 1865 to 1900.

The district was formed in 1865 when the Local Government Act 1858 was adopted in the southern part of the parish of Hornsey. South Hornsey Local Board was formed to govern the area.

The majority of the district (172 acres) consisted of the Brownswood Park area south east of Finsbury Park. Under the Local Government Act 1888, Islington and Stoke Newington became part of the County of London, and the outlying parts of South Hornsey became exclaves of Middlesex within the new county.

The Local Government Act 1894 reconstituted the area as an urban district, and South Hornsey Urban District Council replaced the local board. South Hornsey became a separate civil parish at the same time.

The London Government Act 1899 divided the County of London into metropolitan boroughs and provided for boundary revisions to provide more effective administration. Accordingly, South Hornsey Urban District was abolished in 1900, with the bulk of its area included in the Metropolitan Borough of Stoke Newington (with a population of 16,703), and a small unpopulated part to the neighbouring Borough of Islington.

The records of South Hornsey Local Board and Urban District are held by the archives department of the London Borough of Hackney.

References

 

Local Government Districts created by the Local Government Act 1858
Districts of England created by the Local Government Act 1894
History of local government in Middlesex
Former civil parishes in London